Dragon Dynasty is a joint venture started by The Weinstein Company and Genius Products. The company was created on May 23, 2006 for the sole purpose of distributing East Asian films on DVD in the U.S., whose licenses are held by, or will be acquired by, The Weinstein Company. Dragon Dynasty showcases classic and contemporary Asian cinema, particularly those films which fall under the action and martial arts genre.

History
Quentin Tarantino, who is well recognized for his passionate interest and broad knowledge of Asian cinema, was said to actively work with the Weinsteins in all aspects of Dragon Dynasty.

On March 12, 2007, Dragon Dynasty unveiled its new website featuring an enhanced features and a new layout. While the website had been available since the creation of Dragon Dynasty, the website only had minimal information related to the company and its releases and the website went without updates for several months. The new website features information on its catalog titles, upcoming releases and a blog by Hong Kong cinema expert Bey Logan.

In an interview with Hong Kong Cinemagic on March 6, 2008, Logan confirmed that Dragon Dynasty also intend to roll out their catalogue in the U.K.

In September 2009, Logan left The Weinstein Company, embarking on a new career as a film producer in Hong Kong. He confirmed that Dragon Dynasty would continue releasing East Asian films after his departure and that he would retain a consultancy role to assist the company with future acquisitions.

Vice President of Asian Brand Management and Post Production, Brian White, also left The Weinstein Company in April 2009 to pursue independent production projects, but will maintain his long association with Asian cinema by providing consultancy and production services for the U.K. brand Cine Asia.

As part of the formation of Dragon Dynasty, The Weinstein Company obtained the North American distribution licenses for all 43 titles from Fortune Star Entertainment, the distribution division of News Corporation's STAR Group which owns the world's largest contemporary Chinese-language feature film library. As well, they have obtained distribution licenses to a special collection of 50 classic Shaw Brothers movies and a number of independent acquisitions.

Criticism
On 19 June 2007, Dragon Dynasty released the film My Young Auntie. The film was originally produced in Hong Kong by Shaw Brothers in 1981 and was accordingly released with a Cantonese soundtrack as standard. However, Dragon Dynasty's DVD features only the Mandarin and English dubbed soundtracks. Whilst it is true that some of the cast spoke Mandarin during filming (as is often the case with Hong Kong film productions), the main star (Kara Hui) and many other cast members spoke Cantonese.

On 10 February 2009, Dragon Dynasty released the film My Father Is a Hero under the title The Enforcer. This was the second release from the company that did not include the original Cantonese language soundtrack, containing only the dubbed English audio that had originally featured on the 2000 release from Dimension Films (also owned by The Weinstein Company). Complaints from customers elicited a statement from the company

"Dragon Dynasty strives to provide fans with only the highest quality DVD releases, including restored video and audio and extensive never-before-seen bonus features created exclusively for the label. Though no usable version of the original Cantonese-language track was available in time for this release, every effort was made to bring together the best elements in the world in creating the greatest version of The Enforcer ever experienced on DVD in the U.S."

Other criticisms of Dragon Dynasty DVDs take issue with their release of shorter U.S cuts of films when longer uncut versions are available in Hong Kong and other Asian countries. The film Police Story 3: Super Cop (released as Supercop), which is tagged as the "Ultimate Edition" on the cover artwork, comes in for particular criticism. Although it is the first western DVD release of this film to contain the original Cantonese audio, the DVD still contains the shorter U.S. cut. Contrarily, the DVD features an interview with star Jackie Chan, in which he argues that he has already edited the film once, questioning the American distributors' need to re-edit.

More recently, similar (and often identical) criticisms have been leveled at the label's Blu-ray Disc releases, following their adoption of the format in early 2010.

References

External links
 Dragon Dynasty - Official Site
 The Weinstein Co.

The Weinstein Company
DVD companies of the United States
Companies established in 2006
Home video lines
Films about dragons